Gregory Scott Stadthagen Jr. is an American politician from the state of Alabama. He currently represents Alabama's 9th District in the Alabama House of Representatives. He is a member of the Republican Party.

Education 
Stadthagen graduated from the University of West Alabama with a B.S. in 2002.

Career 
Stadthagen started his business Hagen Homes Incorporated after graduating from college in 2005. He worked as the owner of Hagen Homes until 2018, when he announced his run for State House. Stadthagen holds many local leadership positions in Hartselle, his current place of residence, including Chair of the Hartselle Area Chamber Commerce, member of the Economic Development group of Hartselle, member of the Morgan County Builders Association, member of the Hartselle Rotary, member of the Hartselle Kiwanis, and member of the Leadership of Hartselle Association. Stadthagen won the 2018 Republican Primary for Alabama House District 9 with 62.4% of the vote. He then went on to win the General Election with 99.1% of the vote.

Committee positions 
Stadthagen is a member of the Local Legislation, Boards Agencies and Commissions, and State Government committees.

Elections

Alabama House of Representatives District 9

2018 Republican Primary

2018 General Election

References 

1977 births
21st-century American politicians
Living people
Republican Party members of the Alabama House of Representatives
University of West Alabama alumni